Trường Sa is a township and capital of Trường Sa District, Khánh Hòa Province, Vietnam.

The township consists of Spratly Island and nearby islands, reefs and banks.

See also
Spratly Island

References

Populated places in Khánh Hòa province
District capitals in Vietnam
Townships in Vietnam